John the Hunchback or John Gibbo (Greek: Ίωάννης ό Κυρτός, ; floruit 492–499) was a general and a politician of the Eastern Roman Empire.

Biography 

John was a native of Selymbria, modern Silivri in Turkey. 

Between 492 and 499, he was magister militum praesentalis. In this capacity he was one of two generals of Emperor Anastasius I (r. 491–518) in the Isaurian War of 492–497, along with John the Scythian. In 492 he was one of the commanders of the Roman army at the Battle of Cotyaeum, while the following year he won an overwhelming victory against the Isaurians, after having freed the army of Diogenianus at Claudiopolis. In 498, the year after the victory over the Isaurians, it was John who captured the last enemy leaders, Longinus of Selinus and Indes, and sent them to the Emperor.

Anastasius was very pleased with the victory, and amply rewarded his victorious generals: John the Scythian was made consul for 498, while John the Hunchback held the consulate sine collegis in 499.

According to a story passed down by Procopius of Caesarea (Anecdotes, VI.5-9), John sentenced the officer Justin to death during the Isaurian War, but following a dream, decided to spare his life. After the death of Anastasius, Justin ascended the throne and ruled until his death in 527.

Bibliography 
 Jones, Arnold Hugh Martin, John Robert Martindale, John Morris, "Fl. Ioannes qui et Gibbus 93", Prosopography of the Later Roman Empire, Volume 2, Cambridge University Press, 1980, pp. 617–618.

5th-century Byzantine people
5th-century Roman consuls
Imperial Roman consuls
Magistri militum
Byzantine generals